Why R U?  is a 2020 Thai BL television series starring Suppapong Udomkaewkanjana and Pruk Panich. The series was directed by Thanamin Wongskulphat. The show was premiered in Thailand and aired from January 24, 2020 to March 24, 2020.

Cast

Main role

 Suppapong Udomkaewkanjana (Saint) as Tutor
 Pruk Panich (Zee) as Fighter
 Sittichok Pueakpoolpol (Tommy) as Zon
 Karn Kritsanaphan (Jimmy) as Saifah

Recurring role

 Janistar Phomphadungcheep as Hwahwa
 Akalavut Mankalasut (Pangpond) as Day
 Veerinsara Tangkitsuvanich (Perth) as Zol
 Piamchon Damrongsunthornchai (Tonnam) as Natee
 Saran Rujeerattanavorapan (Max) as Dew
 Natasitt Uareksit (Nat) as Blue
 Parnupat Anomakiti (Park) as Japan
 Wichai Saefant (Seng) as Tanthai
 Sorntast Buangam (Mark) as Champ
 Thanapat Thanachakulphisan (Toy) as Zen
 Ratchapong Anomkiti (Poppy) as Junior
 Arachaporn Pokinpakorn (Goy) as Soda
 Ratchawit Chanrunganan (Graphic) as Tem
 Metinee Kingpayome (Lukkade) as Zon's mother
 Penpetch Benyakul (Jab) as Zon's father
 Rusameekae Fagerlund (James) as Kae
 Peerada Namwong (Paper) as Hwahwa's friend
 Taralatah as Luktan
 Ruengrit McIntosh (Willie) as Fighter's father

Guest role

 Suppasit Jongcheveevat (Mew) as Tharn
 Kanawut Traipipattanapong (Gulf) as Type
 Krittapak Udompanich (Boom) as Tee
 Peemapol Panichtamrong (Peak) as Fuse

Awards 
 Yniverse Awards 2020 - The Greatest Series of the Yniverse
 Yniverse Awards 2020 - Kiss Couple of the Yniverse - Karn Kritsanaphan (Jimmy) & Sittichok Pueakpoolpol (Tommy)
 Yniverse Awards 2020 - Hottest Star of the Yniverse - Pruk Panich (Zee)
 Central BL Awards 2021 (Mexico) - Best Dramatic Scene - Pruk Panich (Zee) & Suppapong Udomkaewkanjana (Saint)
 Central BL Awards 2021 (Mexico) - Best Kiss Scene - Karn Kritsanaphan (Jimmy) & Sittichok Pueakpoolpol (Tommy)

Controversy 

There has been some controversy following the manager of Pruk Panich, Aoftion Kittipat, who was also one of the directors of the series, with fans accusing him of internet scamming them with merchandise many never received. Fans claim to have been waiting for over a year for various merchandise types, with few updates from the official accounts.  As of May 11, 2021 there has been some orders shipped out but still what seems to be hundreds, still waiting for answers about their orders.

References

Thai boys' love television series
Thai comedy television series
2020s LGBT-related comedy television series